Tommaso Orsini (died 25 January 1576) was a Roman Catholic prelate who served as Bishop of Foligno (1568–1576)
and Bishop of Strongoli (1566–1568).

Biography
On 15 August 1566, Tommaso Orsini was appointed during the papacy of Pope Gregory XIII as Bishop of Strongoli.
On 28 August 1566, he was consecrated bishop by Clemente d'Olera, Cardinal-Priest of Santa Maria in Ara Coeli, with Antonmaria Salviati, Bishop Emeritus of Saint-Papoul, and Giulio Antonio Santorio, Archbishop of Santa Severina, serving as co-consecrators. 
On 23 January 1568, he was appointed Bishop of Foligno by Pope Gregory XIII. 
He served as Bishop of Foligno until his death on 25 January 1576.

References

External links and additional sources
 (for Chronology of Bishops) 
 (for Chronology of Bishops)  
 (for Chronology of Bishops) 
 (for Chronology of Bishops) 

16th-century Italian Roman Catholic bishops
Bishops appointed by Pope Pius V
1576 deaths
Bishops of Foligno